Solon Springs is a village in Douglas County, Wisconsin, United States. The population was 600 at the 2010 census. The village is located within the Town of Solon Springs.

History
Solon Springs was first called White Birch, from a grove of white birch trees near the original town site. The present name of Solon Springs honors Thomas F. Solon, who discovered mineral springs here. A post office was established as White Birch in 1885, and the name of the post office was changed to Solon Springs in 1896.

Geography
Solon Springs is located at  (46.351049, -91.818139).

Solon Springs is located 32 miles southeast of the city of Superior.

Demographics

As of 2000 the median income for a household in the village was $30,250, and the median income for a family was $46,875. Males had a median income of $30,500 versus $23,438 for females. The per capita income for the village was $16,807. About 3.7% of families and 10.6% of the population were below the poverty line, including 9.3% of those under age 18 and 8.6% of those age 65 or over.

2010 census
As of the census of 2010, there were 600 people, 263 households, and 168 families residing in the village. The racial makeup of the village was 97.5% White, 0.2% African American, 1.3% Native American, and 1.0% from two or more races. Hispanic or Latino of any race were 0.7% of the population.

There were 263 households, of which 25.9% had children under the age of 18 living with them, 50.2% were married couples living together, 9.9% had a female householder with no husband present, 3.8% had a male householder with no wife present, and 36.1% were non-families. 28.9% of all households were made up of individuals, and 14.8% had someone living alone who was 65 years of age or older. The average household size was 2.28 and the average family size was 2.81.

The median age in the village was 43.1 years. 23.2% of residents were under the age of 18; 5.9% were between the ages of 18 and 24; 23.9% were from 25 to 44; 31.4% were from 45 to 64; and 15.7% were 65 years of age or older. The gender makeup of the village was 48.5% male and 51.5% female.

Transportation

Major highways
U.S. Highway 53 serves as a main route in the community.  The main route, however, now bypasses the village and the original portion of highway that still exists in Solon Springs is referred to as "Business 53".

Airport
Solon Springs Municipal Airport (KOLG) serves the village and surrounding communities.

Education
The Solon Springs School District serves the village and the surrounding town.

References

External links
 Solon Springs, WI – Community Website

Villages in Douglas County, Wisconsin
Villages in Wisconsin